Oscar Nelson (April 22, 1874 – April 2, 1951) was a politician and union leader who served as Illinois treasurer Illinois auditor of public accounts. He also served as the interim president of the Building Service Employees International Union, the precursor of the Service Employees International Union, in 1927.

Early life and early career
Nelson was born in Sweden. He emigrated to the United States and got a job as a delivery boy.  He held employment as a grocery clerk, foundry worker and railway worker, but finally went into the banking industry and eventually became president of the Geneva State Bank and head of the Kane Co. Bankers' Association.

Political and trade union career
Nelson was elected state treasurer in 1922. In 1924, Nelson won election as the Auditor for the state of Illinois and re-elected in 1928.  In 1931, Nelson was tried on charges of malfeasance for refusing to close banks even though he knew they were in poor financial condition. Nelson was acquitted after a state court ruled juries had no jurisdiction over state officers.

Nelson succeeded BSEIU founding president, William Quesse, a close friend and political backer who had died of cancer on February 16, 1927. Nelson resigned due to health concerns on September 3, 1927. Jerry Horan, a BSEIU organizer whose primary job was to act as Quesse's chauffeur, was elected Nelson's successor on September 6, 1927.

A Republican, Nelson was appointed a member of the Republican National Committee's platform drafting panel in 1937.

Other activities
Nelson retired from electoral politics in 1932, but continued to serve served in a number of appointed capacities (most notably on a factory conversion commission after World War II).  He was also president and owner of the Unity Oil & Gas Corporation.

Death
Oscar Nelson died (most probably of a heart attack) in his home in Geneva, Illinois, in 1951.

Notes

References
Beadling, Tom, et al. A Need for Valor: The Roots of the Service Employees International Union, 1902-1992. Washington, D.C.: Service Employees International Union, 1992.
"Capone Effort to Influence Judge Charged." Chicago Daily Tribune. February 25, 1933.
Fitch, Robert. Solidarity For Sale. New York: PublicAffairs, 2006. 
"Horan Installed As Head of Flat Janitor Union." Chicago Daily Tribune. September 7, 1927.
Jentz, John B. "Unions, Cartels, and the Political Economy of American Cities: The Chicago Flat Janitors' Union in the Progressive Era and the 1920s." Studies in American Political Development. 14 (Spring 2000).
Jentz, John B. "Citizenship, Self-Respect, and Political Power: Chicago's Flat Janitors Trailblaze the Service Employees International Union, 1912-1921." Labor's Heritage. 9:1 (Summer 1997).
"100 Philosophers." Time. December 27, 1937.
"Oscar Nelson, 76, banker and G.O.P. Aid, Dies." Chicago Daily Tribune. April 3, 1951.
"Oscar Nelson, 1926-1933." History of the Office. Illinois Comptroller. State of Illinois. No date. Accessed October 1, 2007.
"W.F. Quesse, Labor Chief, Dies of Cancer." Chicago Daily Tribune. February 16, 1927.
Wren, Thomas. "Horan Succeeds Oscar Nelson As Janitors' Chief." Chicago Daily Tribune. September 4, 1927.

1874 births
1951 deaths
Presidents of the Service Employees International Union
Auditors of Public Accounts of Illinois
State treasurers of Illinois
Illinois Republicans
Swedish emigrants to the United States
American trade unionists of Swedish descent